Eugene Corri (c. 1857 − 21 December 1933) was a boxing referee.  He was well-known and popular in the U.K., and was himself a boxer in his youth.  His father changed his surname from Corry to Corri to make it appear more Italian in the hopes of furthering his singing career.  Corri refereed over 2,000 fights, including Mickey Walker against Tommy Milligan in 1927.  He makes an appearance as himself in Alfred Hitchcock's silent movie The Ring (1927), introduced to the audience by the MC.  He was one of the original members of the National Sporting Club.  He published several books, including Fifty Years in the Ring, which appeared the summer before he died.  He died in Southend on 21 December 1933(note: references behind paywall).

References

Boxing referees
1933 deaths